The Dean of Ripon is a senior cleric in the Church of England Diocese of Leeds. The dean is the head of the chapter at Ripon Cathedral – his predecessors were deans of the same church when it was previously the cathedral of the Diocese of Ripon and a minster in the diocese of York.

List of deans

Deans of Ripon Minster

1604–1608 Moses Fowler
1608–1624 Anthony Higgin
1624–1634 John Wilson
1635–1645 Thomas Dod
1646–1662 Vacancy – Commonwealth of England, Scotland and Ireland
1663–1672 John Wilkins
1674–1675 John Neile
1675–1675 Thomas Tully
1675–1686 Thomas Cartwright
1686–1710 Christopher Wyvill
1710–1750 Heneage Dering
1750–1791 Francis Wanley
1791–1828 Darley Waddilove
1828–1836 James Webber

Deans of Ripon Cathedral
1836–1847 James Webber
1847–1859 Hon Henry Erskine (son of Lord Erskine)
1859–1860 Thomas Garnier
1860–1868 William Goode
1868–1876 Hugh Boyd M‘Neile
1876–1876 Sydney Turner
1876–1895 William Fremantle (uncle)
1895–1914 Hon William Fremantle (nephew)
1915–1940 Mansfield Owen
1941–1951 Godwin Birchenough
1951–1967 Llewelyn Hughes
1968–1984 Edwin Le Grice
1984–1995 Christopher Campling
1995–2005 John Methuen
2007–2013 Keith Jukes
2014–present John Dobson

References

Sources
British History Online – Fasti Ecclesiae Anglicanae 1541–1857 – Deans of Ripon (Cathedral)

Lists of Anglicans
 
Lists of English people
Ripon, Dean of